Chris Gerlufsen (born September 16, 1976) is an American college basketball coach who is the  head coach of the San Francisco Dons men's basketball team. He served as the acting head coach for Hawaii during their 2019–20 season while head coach Eran Ganot took a leave of medical absence, compiling an 8–5 record during that period.

Early life and college
Gerlufsen is a native of Philadelphia, and the son of former University of Massachusetts head coach Ron Gerlufsen.

Gerlufsen played at Randolph–Macon College in Ashland, Virginia where he was a guard and a captain on teams that made the NCAA Division III tournament twice. Gerlufsen graduated from Randolph–Macon with a degree in business and economics in 1998.

Coaching career

Early coaching career
Gerlufsen began his coaching career at Washington College in Maryland as a graduate assistant in 1998, before spending a season at Southwestern. He joined The Citadel in 2000, where he was a graduate assistant for a year before joining the staff full-time in 2001. He was promoted to lead assistant before the start of the 2003–04 season. He left after the 2005–06 season to join the coaching staff at Hartford.

Hartford
Gerlufsen spent seven years as an assistant coach at Hartford before being promoted to associate head coach at the start of the 2013–14 season. He also served as the team's recruiting coordinator during his tenure there.

San Diego
On April 28, 2015, it was announced that Gerlufsen would be joining the University of San Diego's men's basketball program as an assistant coach. He spent four seasons there, three as an assistant on Lamont Smith's staff, and one year as an assistant on Sam Scholl's staff, where he was instrumental in turning a 9 win team into a 21 win team. Gerlufsen left after the 2018–19 season to join the coaching staff at Hawaii.

Hawaii
Gerlufsen was introduced as the new assistant coach for Hawaii on September 3, 2019, serving as the team's lead assistant and de facto offensive coordinator. On November 6, he was named acting head coach after head coach Eran Ganot took a medical leave of absence. He compiled an 8–5 record as acting head coach, relinquishing head coaching duties on December 28 when Ganot returned from medical leave.

San Francisco
Gerlufsen joined San Francisco in 2021 as their associate head coach. After Todd Golden's departure to take the head coaching position at Florida, Gerlufsen was elevated to head coach.

Head coaching record

Notes

References

External links
 
 San Francisco profile
 San Diego profile

1976 births
Living people
American men's basketball coaches
Guards (basketball)
Hartford Hawks men's basketball coaches
Hawaii Rainbow Warriors basketball coaches
Randolph–Macon Yellow Jackets men's basketball players
San Diego Toreros men's basketball coaches
San Francisco Dons men's basketball coaches
The Citadel Bulldogs basketball coaches
Washington College Shoremen basketball coaches
Sportspeople from Philadelphia
Basketball coaches from Pennsylvania
Basketball players from Philadelphia